Paul Raud ( in Kirikuküla, Viru-Jaagupi Parish – 22 November 1930 in Tallinn) was an Estonian painter.

Life and works
The twin brother of painter Kristjan Raud, he studied at the Kunstakademie Düsseldorf beginning in 1886, becoming influenced by the work of Eduard von Gebhardt. He is associated with the Düsseldorf school of painting. 

After his return to Estonia, he painted mainly portrait commissions for some time, before traveling with his brother and Amandus Adamson to the islands of Muhu and Pakri in 1896.  His works of this period are reminiscent of those of Max Liebermann.  

In 1899 he returned to work in Germany, taking on some of the stylistic trappings of Impressionism; this, coupled with time spent working with Ilya Repin, influenced his later style.  Later in his career, most especially during and after World War I, he began to teach, from 1915 working as a drawing instructor at the Tallinn Institute of Commerce and from 1923 at the State School of Industrial Art in Tallinn.

Paul Raud is represented with works in the Art Museum of Estonia, Tallinn.

Gallery

External links

"From one Century to the Next: Exhibition of works by Kristjan and Paul Raud in Kumu Art Museum June 22–October 8, 2006, information folder from the Art Museum of Estonia
Works by Paul Raud at the Art Museum of Estonia

References
Biography from answers.com

1865 births
1930 deaths
People from Vinni Parish
People from the Governorate of Estonia
19th-century Estonian painters
19th-century Estonian male artists
20th-century Estonian painters
20th-century Estonian male artists
Estonian twins
Burials at Rahumäe Cemetery
Düsseldorf school of painting